The 2011 lunar eclipse may refer to:

 June 2011 lunar eclipse
 December 2011 lunar eclipse